Plexippus redimitus is a species of spider of the genus Plexippus. It is native to India and Sri Lanka.

References

Salticidae
Spiders of the Indian subcontinent
Arthropods of Sri Lanka
Spiders described in 1902
Taxa named by Eugène Simon